Amphicallia pratti is a moth of the  subfamily Arctiinae. It is found on Madagascar.

References

Moths described in 1914
Arctiini
Moths of Madagascar
Moths of Africa